The Oregon Ducks softball team represents the University of Oregon in NCAA Division I college softball in the Pac-12 Conference. The head coach is Melyssa Lombardi who is entering her third season with the Ducks. Oregon will now play home games at Jane Sanders Stadium after playing at Howe Field through 2015. Oregon has appeared in eight Women's College World Series, in 1976, 1980, 1989, 2012, 2014, 2015, 2017 and 2018.

History

Coaching history

Championships

Conference Championships

Coaching staff

Year-by-year results

Women's College World Series Results

Notable players

Conference awards
Pac-12 Player of the Year
Katie Wiese (1989)

Pac-12 Pitcher of the Year
Jessica Moore (2013)
Cheridan Hawkins (2014, 2015, 2016)
Megan Kleist (2018)

Pac-12 Freshman of the Year
Jennifer Salling (2007)
Samantha Pappas (2010)
Jenna Lilley (2015)
Megan Kleist (2016)

Pac-12 Defensive Player of the Year
Janelle Lindvall (2016)

Pac-12 Coach of the Year
Teresa Wilson (1989)
Mike White (2013, 2014, 2016)

See also
 List of NCAA Division I softball programs

References